Pyotr Grigorievich Goncharov (18 October 1888 – 20 March 1970, Kyiv) was a Russian/soviet composer, conductor and choirmaster.

Biography
Born to a poor family in Kyiv in 1888, in what was then the Russian Empire, Goncharov was a choral singer in his youth. In 1907, he graduated from the Baltic Fleet Musical College, where he studied clarinet. During his time at the college, he received lessons in conducting, harmony, composition and orchestral score reading from the famed Russian composer Reinhold Glière. He was later mentored by Alexander Koshetz. From 1907, he conducted the choirs of St Volodymyr's Cathedral and, later, Saint Sophia's Cathedral, Kyiv.
Goncharov lost his sight due to illness in 1921, but remained active as a conductor and composer. He founded the Southwestern Railway Chorus, and also worked for the Kiev State Opera and the Ukrainian State Choir (DUMKA).

In 1940, he moved to Lviv. There he became the conductor of the newly-founded and now famous Ukrainian Trembita Chorus, while simultaneously working for the Lviv Opera, conducting its choir and orchestra.

In 1942, after the Nazi occupation of Kyiv, he returned there to again conduct the choir of St Volodymyr's Cathedral. 
Goncharov died in Kyiv in 1970, and was buried in Baikove Cemetery.

Works 

This latter is noteworthy in that it includes one of the lowest notes in the basso profondo range (C2). "To Your Cross" was used in the soundtracks of Chris Marker's 1962 film, La Jetée.

See also
List of Ukrainian composers

References

External links
 (uk) "Awarded Oblivion" Dzerkalo Tyzhnia 26 March 1995 (archived September 2006)
 
 (uk) All Ukrainian Expert Network: This day in History (People and events) 18 October
 (uk) Ukrainian Sacred Music: Pyotr Grigorievich Goncharov
 Virtual International Authority File: Гончаров, Пётр Григорьевич‏
 MusicBrainz catalogue: Pyotr Gontcharov
 (uk) To Your Cross (sheet music) (web archive)
 (uk) Encyclopedia of Modern Ukraine: Pyotr Grigorievich Goncharov

 

1888 births
1970 deaths
Musicians from Kyiv
20th-century classical composers
Ukrainian classical composers
Ukrainian conductors (music)
20th-century conductors (music)
20th-century male musicians